Edgar Duff Seymour (June 25, 1912, Cedar Falls, Iowa – April 30, 2011) was an American bobsledder who competed in the late 1950s.

He attended the Pennsylvania State University from 1934 to 1938. At the 1956 Winter Olympics in Cortina d'Ampezzo he finished sixth with his partner Arthur Tyler in the two-man event.

See also
List of Pennsylvania State University Olympians

References
Bobsleigh two-man results: 1932-56, 1964-present 
List of Penn State alumni featuring Seymour.
Wallechinsky, David (1984). "Bobsled: Two-man". In The Complete Book of the Olympics: 1896 - 1980. New York: Penguin Books. p. 558.
Edgar Seymour's profile at Sports Reference.com
Edgar Seymour's 90th birthday announcement
Edgar Seymour's obituary

1912 births
2011 deaths
American male bobsledders
Olympic bobsledders of the United States
Bobsledders at the 1956 Winter Olympics
Pennsylvania State University alumni
People from Cedar Falls, Iowa